Cyclophora dyschroa is a moth in the  family Geometridae. It is found in Trinidad.

References

Moths described in 1918
Cyclophora (moth)
Moths of the Caribbean